Nandod is one of the 182 Legislative Assembly constituencies of Gujarat state in India. It is part of Narmada district and is reserved for candidates belonging to the Scheduled Tribes. The seat came into existence due to the delimitation exercise in 2008 and it is a part of the Chhota Udaipur Lok Sabha constituency.

Segments
This assembly seat represents the following segments

Nandod Taluka – entire taluka except Dhefa village
Tilakwada Taluka

Members of Legislative Assembly

Election results

2022

2017

2012

See also
List of constituencies of Gujarat Legislative Assembly
Gujarat Legislative Assembly

References

External links
 

Assembly constituencies of Gujarat
Narmada district